Hongkong Jet is a charter airline from Hong Kong. It commenced operations in 2011 and has its main hub at Hong Kong. Its fleet comprises one ACJ 318, two ACJ 319 and one ACJ 330-200 aircraft.

Fleet

See also
 List of airlines of Hong Kong

References 

Airlines of Hong Kong
2011 establishments in Hong Kong
Airlines established in 2011